The Ural Striped Maned pigeon is a breed of domestic pigeon, white in color, found principally in the Ural region of Russia.

Origin
Striped maned pigeons were brought to the Ural region in the 18th century. These pigeons were bred at the Count Orloffs' dovecotes.

External appearance

Small-sized, up to 25 cm from the chest to the tail end. The body is stream-lined. The neck is short. The chest is wide, slightly prominent. The back is wide in the shoulders and is inclined towards the tail. The wings are tight against the body and lie on the tail. Set low on the legs.

 Head: round, the forehead is wide and prominent. The sinciput is weakly pronounced. The occiput is rounded and smoothly blends into the neck.
 Eyes: expressive, dark-colored.
 Bill: short (7–10 mm), thin, tightly closed. The maxilla slightly hangs over the mandible. The bill is white.
 Cere: small, smooth, tight against the bill.
 Eyelid: narrow, thin, white-colored.
 Neck: short, strong, without flexure.
 Chest: wide, well developed, slightly prominent.
 Back: wide in the shoulders, straight.
 Wings: tight against the body, lie on the tail and are 1–2 cm shorter than the tail.
 Tail: tightly closed, straight, 12 feathers. The feathers are wide. The tail and the back form a straight line.
 Legs and feet: short, crimson-colored, 2.5 cm from the metatarsus to the heel. The claws are white.
 Feather decorations: No.
 Feather quality: The plumage is tight. The fan is wide.

Pattern
Mainly white in color. A colored spot or a "cap" 10 mm in diameter is present on the sinciput. A red-colored spot or the "mane" is located on the back of the neck, 2.0-3.0 cm below the occiput. The mane goes symmetrically down the back of the neck. The mane may be shaped as an oval, a crescent or a triangle. The tail is red and has a white stripe 2–3 cm wide. The undertail is white or red. Otherwise the pigeon is white. The hens have a narrower white stripe in the tail.

Permissible defects
The colored "cap" slightly "slips" from the sinciput. The colored mane goes down to the back in the form of a dovetail. Insignificant irregularities in the mane shape. The white stripe in the tail is insufficiently bright. The eyes are white. The undertail is mottled. A weak grayish color of the tail.

Impermissible defects
A narrow head. The bill is longer than 10 mm. Crests, feathered legs and feet. Set high on the legs. Different color of the eyes. Drooping wings. The mane "slips" to the craw or the wing flaps. A massive body. White feathers in the tail. Colored feathers in other parts of the body and the wings. Absence of the white stripe in the tail. Absence of the colored "cap" on the sinciput. Absence of the mane on the neck.

See also
List of pigeon breeds

References

Pigeon breeds